A company commander is the commanding officer of a company, a military unit which typically consists of 100 to 250 soldiers, often organized into three or four smaller units called platoons. The exact organization of a company varies by country, service, and unit type. Aviation companies can have as few as 40 personnel, while some specialized companies such as maintenance or training units are considerably larger and may number as many as 500 personnel. In some forces, the second-in-command of a company is called the executive officer (XO).

Historically, companies were often formed and financed by individual owners rather than by the state. Sometimes these men were unable to personally exercise leadership and command over the men in their units, and would designate another individual to serve in that capacity.

Austria
In the Austrian Army, a company commander is called a Kompaniekommandant (abbreviated "KpKdt").

Finland
In the Finnish Defence Forces, a company commander is known as a "Komppanianpäällikkö" (abbreviated "KPÄÄL"). A Finnish company commander is usually a part of the cadre and ranks captain in peacetime and lieutenant in wartime when higher-ranking officers are needed to fulfil more demanding roles.

Germany
In the German Army, a company commander is referred to as a Kompaniechef or Einheitsführer and is usually a major. In many companies of the medical corps (Sanitätsdienst), the Kompaniechef must be a medical officer (Sanitätsoffizier) and has the rank of major, titled as an Oberstabsarzt (staff doctor) or may possibly be a lieutenant colonel Oberfeldarzt (field doctor).

In the artillery and the army's anti-aircraft defense corps the company commander is called a Batteriechef.  In the German Air Force and Army Aviation Corps the title is "Staffelkapitän", while in training schools "Inspektionschef".

Indonesia
In the Indonesian Armed Forces, a company commander is referred to as "Komandan Kompi" often shortened as "Danki". It is usually commanded by a captain (Kapten).

Switzerland
In the Swiss Armed Forces, a company commander is called in German Kompaniekommandant (abbreviated Kp Kdt).  In practical service, a Kompaniekommandant has the rank of lieutenant until graduating from Führungslehrgang or FLG (Leadership course) 1 and completing Abverdienen (practical service), at which point they are promoted to captain.  A Kompaniekommandant who leads a Stabskompanie can be promoted to major.

Turkey
In the Turkish Army, a company commander is called a Bölük Komutanı (abbreviated "Bl.K."). Usually a company commander is in the rank of captain.

United Kingdom
In the British Army, Royal Marines and Canadian Army, the term "company commander" is also commonly used for the officer (usually a major) formally titled the officer commanding (OC)

United States
In the United States Army, Marine Corps and United States Navy the position of company commander is usually held by a captain or lieutenant with three to six years of service as an officer. A senior first lieutenant or lieutenant junior grade may be selected for company command in lieu of an available captain or lieutenant. As commanding officer, he or she exercises full command and control over the unit and may exercise non-judicial punishment authority over unit personnel.  A company command billet is usually considered a prestigious assignment and important in career progression if an officer hopes to attain higher rank.  A typical tour of duty for this assignment averages 12 months in the active duty component and 24 to 36 months in the reserve components. Usually, a company executive officer and a company first sergeant / chief petty officer are assigned to assist the company commander and both are vital to his or her success in commanding the unit. Some specialized company-sized units, such as Aviation and Seabee companies are assigned a Major / lieutenant commander as a company commander due to the increased responsibility of such assignments; the platoons which comprise these companies are typically commanded by captains rather than lieutenants, with another captain, rather than a first lieutenant, as the company's second-in-command. In the U.S. Navy, company commanders serve as SeaBee commanders.

In the United States Navy Seabees, the position of company commander is typically held by a navy lieutenant (O3) with four to ten years of service as an officer. Typically, the junior lieutenants command Bravo, Charlie and specialized companies. The senior lieutenants typically command Alpha Company, due to its larger size, and increased responsibility, due to overseeing construction and automotive equipment. Since 2013, navy lieutenant commanders (O4) have typically been overseeing Alpha Companies on the reserve component side.

In the United States Coast Guard, a company commander is the enlisted person in charge of a recruit company's training during boot camp. They are the Coast Guard's equivalent of a drill instructor. (The United States Navy once used the same term in its recruit training, but that title has been replaced by "recruit division commander".)

See also
 Company Commander (game)

Military ranks
Titles